Mienerita debilis is a species of sea snail, a marine gastropod mollusk in the family Neritidae.

Description

Distribution

References

External links
 Dekker, H. (2000). The Neritidae from the circumarabian seas. Vita Marina. 47(2): 29-64

Neritidae